New Orleans–Baton Rouge passenger rail is a proposed inter-city passenger train service between New Orleans and Baton Rouge along the I-10 corridor in the U.S. state of Louisiana. The route would connect the state's largest city to its second-largest city and state capital.

, the project is moving forward but remains unfunded. Initial service is expected to consist of two daily round trips, with intermediate stops that include Louis Armstrong International Airport, LaPlace, and Gonzales.

History

The last passenger train to run between New Orleans and Baton Rouge was the Kansas City Southern Railway's Southern Belle, discontinued in 1969. Kansas City Southern (KCS) still owns one of the three extant rail lines between New Orleans and Baton Rouge.

In 2009, Louisiana Governor Bobby Jindal rejected $300 million in federal stimulus money from the American Recovery and Reinvestment Act of 2009 that would have gone toward the route.

Recent efforts 

In spring 2021, Amtrak included the  route in its 15-year "Amtrak Connects US" expansion vision. The proposal calls for two round trips per day with a one-way trip time of 1 hour 34 minutes. Intermediate stops are listed as Louis Armstrong New Orleans International Airport, LaPlace, and Gonzales. Economic benefit is estimated at $1.1 billion in one-time investment plus $25.6 million annually. 

In December 2021, Canadian Pacific Railway shareholders approved the company's $31 billion takeover of Kansas City Southern. As part of its appeal to regulators, CP committed to supporting one round trip per day between New Orleans and Baton Rouge if the merger were to be approved. The move was supported by Governor John Bel Edwards and New Orleans Mayor LaToya Cantrell.

In April 2022, Governor John Bel Edwards promoted the project by riding an inspection train over the proposed route.

In June 2022 the Louisiana Legislature approved $37.5 million toward the project to meet federal dollar-matching obligations. In August the U.S. Department of Transportation awarded a $20 million RAISE grant toward the design and construction of the Baton Rouge and Gonzales train stations. The total cost estimate is $46.6 million for the two stations and $260 million for the total route. Baton Rouge has said it will contribute $3.25 million toward its station.

In November 2022, plans for two daily round trips trips on the corridor were moving forward. A consultant working on the project said that engineering and financing studies should be completed in February 2023. The preliminary cost of infrastructure upgrades is estimated at $250–300 million, with $80–$100 million going toward rebuilding the Bonnet Carré Spillway Bridge. Louisiana is applying for federal funding authorized by the Infrastructure Investment and Jobs Act. Once funded, construction is expected to take 18 to 24 months.

References

External links
 

Passenger rail transportation in Louisiana
Proposed Amtrak routes